Rebop may be:

 An early name for bebop, a form of jazz music, still used in the UK in the 1970s
 Rebop Kwaku Baah, Ghanaian percussionist with Traffic
 Rebop (TV series), an American television show produced by WGBH Boston from 1976 to 1979
 The Re-Bops, a kids' band